VH1 Storytellers is a live album by David Bowie. It was released on 6 July 2009 and features a 23 August 1999 performance on Storytellers, a VH1 program.

Background and recording

VH1 Storytellers is the last performance with collaborator and guitarist Reeves Gabrels, whom Bowie had met in 1987 and worked with since, including in the band Tin Machine. Gabrels quit the band 4 days after the show was recorded, leaving Bowie to scramble to find a lead guitarist for his upcoming Hours Tour.

Packaging and releases
The package contained an audio CD and a DVD of footage, with the DVD including four bonus tracks not heard on the CD. The set list comprises songs that spanned Bowie's career until that point, from the 1960s until his then soon-to-be released album Hours (1999).  VH1 Storytellers was released on vinyl on 11 October 2019; the double album included the four bonus recordings.

Track listing
All tracks written by David Bowie except where noted.

Personnel
David Bowie: vocals, guitar
Reeves Gabrels: guitar
Mark Plati: guitars
Gail Ann Dorsey: bass guitar, vocals
Mike Garson: piano, keyboards
Sterling Campbell: drums, percussion
Holly Palmer and Lani Groves: background vocals
Audio remixer: Mark Plati
Audio mixer: Thom Cadley

Charts

References

David Bowie live albums
David Bowie video albums
2009 live albums
Live video albums
2009 video albums
EMI Records live albums
Concert films
VH1 Storytellers